Daniel Vischer (16 January 1950 – 17 January 2017) was a Swiss politician. He represented the Green Party. He was elected to the National Council in 2003, and was reelected twice in 2007 and 2011. His term ended in 2015.

Born in Basel, Vischer was the son of jurist Frank Vischer (1923–2015). He was married and had two children.

Vischer died from cancer on 17 January 2017, a day after his 67th birthday, in Zürich.

References

1950 births
2017 deaths
Deaths from cancer in Switzerland
Green Party of Switzerland politicians
Members of the National Council (Switzerland)
Politicians from Basel-Stadt
20th-century Swiss lawyers
Politicians from Zürich
20th-century Swiss politicians
21st-century Swiss politicians